Manchester Road railway station is a closed station in the city of Bradford, West Yorkshire, England. The station opened in 1878 but closed to passengers in 1915. The goods yard remained open until 1963.

The station was bypassed by a single line after 1963 to serve the City Road Goods Branch. After closure of the line, the site has been overbuilt with a Royal Mail sorting office.

A pub remains nearby, called the Station Hotel.

References

Disused railway stations in Bradford
Former Great Northern Railway stations
Railway stations in Great Britain opened in 1878
Railway stations in Great Britain closed in 1915